\o/ may refer to:

 Victory
 Exasperation

See also 
 Emoticon